Money in the Bank is a novel by P. G. Wodehouse, first published in the United States on 9 January 1942 by Doubleday, Doran, New York, and in the United Kingdom on 27 May 1946 by Herbert Jenkins, London.  UK publication was delayed while Wodehouse was under suspicion of collaboration during the Second World War. The book was published in English in Germany in August 1949 by Tauchnitz.

The country house Shipley Hall, which features in this novel and Something Fishy (1957), was based on a real house, Fairlawne, where Wodehouse's daughter Leonora lived after she married in 1932.

Plot summary
J G Miller, Jeff to his friends, takes on his first case at law with the aid of the father of his fiancée Myrtle Shoesmith. One of the opposing witnesses is Jeff’s old enemy Lionel Green, whom he questions in such a lively manner that the performance is reported in the newspapers. Displeased by the spectacle Jeff has made of himself, Myrtle abandons her project of moulding his character and ends their engagement. Jeff is relieved and happy. He celebrates with a drink, and in the ensuing uninhibited mood, notices the unappetizing rock cakes recently given him by his housekeeper. Not wishing to hurt her feelings, Jeff throws the cakes into the apparently empty office across the way, intending to tell her he has eaten them. The office, occupied by the J Sheringham Adair detective agency, is not as empty as it looks, and an angry man appears in the doorway. Jeff hastens over to apologise. The man, crooked American private detective Chimp Twist, thinks Jeff is coming to attack him and hides in a closet. Finding the office empty, Jeff is perplexed and sits down in Twist's chair to collect himself. He is found there by Anne Benedick, who has come to hire a detective. Lovestruck, and ready for any excuse to be with Anne, Jeff pretends to be J Sheringham Adair and accepts the job.

They are joined by Anne's uncle George, Lord Uffenham. Niece and uncle explain that Lord Uffenham keeps the family wealth as a cache of diamonds, hidden in continuously-changed locations around his ancestral home of Shipley Hall. Head trauma from a car crash has caused him to forget the current hiding place. He cannot search for the diamonds at his leisure because Shipley Hall is rented presently to Anne's employer Clarissa Cork, a woman on a crusade to get people to eat a vegetarian diet, excluding even chocolates, as the African tribe she admires did not eat them. To retain access to the Hall, Lord Uffenham has been masquerading as Cakebread, the butler, whom the lease forbids Mrs Cork to fire. Mrs Cork has observed her ostensible butler searching the house, and sent Anne to procure a detective to keep him under surveillance. Jeff promises Anne that he will keep Cakebread's true identity a secret.

Jeff goes to the hall and meets Mrs Cork, who expands his duties to watching her nephew Lionel Green and Anne Benedick, as she fears they are romantically involved. Privately, Lord Uffenham confirms that Anne and Lionel are engaged, adding that it would please him if Jeff took Lionel's place. In the meantime, Jeff must keep Lionel from denouncing him as an impostor. The two come to terms after Jeff helps Lionel to evade the scrutiny of Mrs Cork and break his vegetarian diet.

Mrs Cork sought a detective at J Sheringham Adair on the recommendation of Dolly Molloy, a guest at the Hall. Dolly and her husband Soapy are secretly small-time crooks from Chicago, who had hoped that their old associate Chimp Twist would join them in their plot to steal Lord Uffenham's diamonds. When Jeff arrives instead, Dolly visits Chimp in London to learn what has gone wrong. Meanwhile, Soapy has talked Mrs Cork into buying the phony oil stock he sells. Dolly confronts Jeff, who makes terms with the Molloys; neither will expose the other. Still uneasy, Dolly attempts to kill Jeff with a fraudulent accident. The attempt fails, but Jeff is moved to purchase accident insurance.

Jeff uses him time at the Hall to romance Anne, but as the two grow closer she realizes she has seen him somewhere before. Finally she remembers watching him play rugby football for England the previous fall, listed in the program as J G Miller— the man Anne resents for having humiliated her fiancé in court. The two part on bad terms, and Jeff kisses her once before she can walk away.

Mrs Cork sees the kiss, which convinces her that Anne is not involved with Lionel. She finally consents to give Lionel the loan he has been requesting, to allow him to buy into partnership in an interior decorating business. Anne begins to grow disillusioned with Lionel, whose secrecy about their engagement suggests that he cares more about the loan. She also learns of the undignified bargain he made with Jeff.

Chimp Twist belatedly arrives at the Hall, but Dolly has decided against partnering with him and sets him up to be caught by Cakebread. Twist eludes Cakebread and hides in the room of a guest, Mr Trumper. Mrs Cork discovers him there, hiding in a wardrobe, and Jeff's imposture is revealed.

Jeff tells Mrs Cork that he came to the Hall under false pretenses because he is in love with Anne. She is inclined to let him stay, until she discovers that he is the J G Miller who gave Lionel a bad time in court. Jeff pacifies her with flattery, asking that she autograph his copy of her book.

Having imprisoned Mrs Cork and Mr Trumper in the cellar, the Molloys discover Cakebread and Jeff examining a jar of Pond's tobacco which presumably contains the diamonds. Anne sees the ensuing struggle for the jar. She cries out when Jeff is hit on the head, showing that she still cares for him. After the Molloys drive away with the jar, Lord Uffenham releases Mrs Cork and Mr Trumper, who discovered their love for one another while in the cellar and are now engaged. In the midst of these tumultuous events, Lord Uffenham remembers that the diamonds are not in the tobacco jar. He hastens to dig them out of their true hiding place, the bank of the pond on the Hall grounds. Anne agrees to marry Jeff.

Characters

J G Miller: Called Jeff. He has just completed his studies as a barrister. He also is a player of rugby football (a scrum half) and a writer of thrillers. When the novel opens, he is engaged to Myrtle Shoesmith, and is not quite sure how they became engaged.
Lionel Green: He is a witness for the opposing side in Jeff's first appearance as a barrister. He is Clarissa's nephew, an interior decorator whom Jeff hated at private school and called Stinker. He is a conventionally handsome man.
Orlo Tarvin: Successful interior decorator who is willing to take Lionel in as a partner, if Lionel can invest enough cash.
Ernest Pennefather: He is a taxicab driver suing Tarvin and who is represented by Jeff.
Myrtle Shoesmith: Strong-willed young woman who is engaged to Jeff.
Mr Shoesmith: He is Myrtle's father and a solicitor.
Ma Balsam: Jeff's motherly housekeeper who makes rock cakes to serve with tea.
Anne Benedick: She is 23 years old and secretary-companion to Clarissa. In secret, she is engaged to Lionel.
George, Viscount Uffenham: Owner of Shipley Hall and uncle to Anne Benedick. He lets his mind go where it wanders, and he does not like banks as a place to keep the family money. He has moved the stash of diamonds almost daily, until he is in a car accident, which makes his memory erratic. He feels that if he never does remember where he hid the diamonds, he must marry the wealthy Mrs Cork, as honour demands he give his niece her portion. It is a heavy weight on him, as he does not like her. He is known as Cakebread when working as the butler at Shipley Hall.
J Sheringham Adair: Name of the detective agency for Chimp Twist, which Jeff uses as his pseudonym at Shipley Hall.
Dolly Molloy: Brassy, golden-haired shoplifting wife of Soapy, the brains of the couple.
Soapy Molloy: Con man who tries to sell phony oil stocks to anyone who will listen to him.
Alexander "Chimp" Twist: Crony of the Molloys who runs a detective agency in London, having left America behind. Small man with a large, waxed moustache.
Clarissa Cork — Tall and energetic widow and a big game hunter who wrote the book, 'A Woman in the Wilds'. She rented Shipley Hall to run it as a place for plain living and higher thinking. She is the aunt of Lionel Green.
Eustace Trumper: Small man who loves Clarissa Cork, and is staying at the Hall.
Mrs Cleghorn: Guest at the Hall who wants to learn Mrs Cork's teachings.
Mr Shepperson: Guest at the Hall who wants to learn Mrs Cork's teachings. He likes the vegetarian meals and he bathes in the pond.
Cakebread: Lord Uffenham's pseudonym as the Shipley Hall butler

Reviews
One contemporary review found this novel "very good Wodehouse" and "stopping just this side of being side-splitting."

Allusions to other novels
George, sixth viscount Uffenham, a typically impecunious and absent-minded Wodehousian aristocrat appears later in the novel Something Fishy (1957),  where he helps Anne’s sister Jane.

The story also features the crooks Alexander "Chimp" Twist and "Dolly" and "Soapy" Molloy, who had earlier appeared in Sam the Sudden (1925) and Money for Nothing (1928).

Publication history
The novel was first published as a serial in The Saturday Evening Post in November–December 1941. It was published in the US in 1942, but not in the UK until 1946 due to war time tensions between the UK and Wodehouse. Neither the US nor the UK editions had a dedication.

The edition published in Stuttgart, Germany in 1949 by Tauchnitz was dedicated to Bert Hoskins, with whom Wodehouse had been interned in Germany early in the Second World War. Wodehouse sent a gift of each of his later novels to Mr Hoskins. The novel was written in Germany, while Wodehouse was held at Tost.

A collector's edition of the novel was issued in 2005 by Abrams Press, .

References

External links
 The Russian Wodehouse Society's page, with a list of characters
Literary and Cultural References in Money in the Bank.

Novels by P. G. Wodehouse
1942 British novels
English novels
Herbert Jenkins books
Doubleday, Doran books
British comedy novels